Wilbur Glenn Voliva (March 10, 1870 – October 11, 1942) was an American evangelist and Flat Earth theorist who controlled the town of Zion, Illinois, during the early 20th century.

Early life and education
Voliva was born on a farm in Indiana on March 10, 1870. In 1889, he entered Union Christian College, Merom Indiana; he graduated five years later and became a minister. In 1898 he was drawn to the teachings of John Alexander Dowie and eventually joined his congregation, becoming an elder of the Christian Catholic Church of Zion, Illinois. In 1901 he emigrated to Australia to become overseer-in-charge of the Australian branch.

Leadership of church
In September 1905, Dowie suffered a stroke and recuperated in Jamaica, claiming $2,000 a month expenses from the investments, and asked Voliva to return to oversee the city in his absence.
Voliva arrived in February 1906, whereupon the congregation revolted against Dowie's leadership, accusing him of corruption and polygamy, and elected Voliva as head of the church, which he then renamed to the "Christian Catholic Apostolic Church." By careful management he rescued Zion from bankruptcy, gaining the support of the church members. He kept tight control on some 6,000 followers who made up the community, even up to the point of dictating their choice of marriage partners. The city of Zion was effectively controlled by the church; all of its real estate, while sold at market rates, was conveyed under an 1,100-year lease, subject to many restrictions and to termination at the whim of the General Overseer. Religions other than the Christian Catholic Apostolic Church were effectively banned – visiting preachers from rival sects were harassed and hounded out of town by the city police force.

Voliva diversified Zion Industries, an industrial concern owned by the church that manufactured Scottish lace, to include a bakery which produced the popular Zion brand fig bar cookies and White Dove chocolates. Zion was a company town and its workers were paid substandard wages.

Voliva introduced many new rules for members and notices were placed around the town with stern warnings that the independents (who didn't belong to the church) resented and often burned. But the city was established as a safe space for those within its boundaries.

Flat earth and other views
From 1914, Voliva gained nationwide notoriety by his vigorous advocacy of the flat earth doctrine. He offered a widely publicized $5,000 challenge for anyone to disprove the flat earth theory. The church schools in Zion taught the flat earth doctrine. In 1923 Voliva became the first evangelical preacher in the world to own his own radio station, WCBD, which could be heard as far away as Central America. His radio station broadcast his diatribes against round earth astronomy, and the evils of evolution. He was quoted about the sun as follows:

He became increasingly focused on destroying the 'trinity of evils': modern astronomy, evolution and higher criticism, insisting on a strict interpretation of 24-hour days for creation and travelling to Dayton, Tennessee to appear as a witness at the Scopes trial, desipite the fact that he was not called. Voliva also predicted the end of the world would come in 1923, 1927, 1930, 1934 and 1935.

Decline and death
Like his predecessor, Voliva increasingly developed an overtly lavish lifestyle, amassing a $5 million personal fortune by 1927. This began to alienate his followers, especially after the hardships brought on by the Great Depression which forced Zion Industries into bankruptcy. In 1935 Voliva tried to revive the flagging fortunes of the church by instituting the annual Zion Passion Play, along the lines of the famous one in Oberammergau. However, in 1937, a disgruntled employee set ablaze the church's huge Shiloh Tabernacle where the play took place. Shortly thereafter, Voliva was forced into personal bankruptcy and he was reduced to being the honorary president of Zion Industries. The governance of the city reverted to the independents and the new authorities selected a globe for the compulsory car sticker that Voliva was forced to put on his car. He spent most of his time in Florida where he hoped to establish another religious colony, but after being diagnosed with terminal cancer, Voliva made a tearful public confession to his followers that he had misappropriated church funds for his personal use and committed other misdeeds. He died shortly thereafter on October 11, 1942 (though he had previously stated that he would live to 120 due to his diet of Brazil nuts and buttermilk), and the church all but dissolved. A small remnant was reorganized under the leadership of Michael Mintern. It was later renamed "Christ Community Church."

Notes

References

External links
  
 

1870 births
1942 deaths
19th-century apocalypticists
20th-century apocalypticists
American Pentecostals
Religious scandals
Flat Earth proponents
American expatriates in Australia